Sertularia is a genus of hydroids in the family Sertulariidae.

Species
The following species are recognized in the genus Sertularia:

Sertularia albimaris Mereschkowsky, 1877
Air Fern (Sertularia argentea Linnaeus, 1758)
Sertularia australis (Kirchenpauer, 1864)
Sertularia borneensis Billard, 1925
Sertularia brashnikowi Kudelin, 1914
Sertularia brunnea (Stechow, 1923)
Sertularia camtschatika Vinogradov, 1947
Sertularia ceylonensis Stechow, 1921
Sertularia conferta (Kirchenpauer, 1864)
Sertularia converrucosa Naumov, 1960
Sertularia cupressina Linnaeus, 1758
Sertularia cupressoides Clark, 1876
Sertularia distans (Lamouroux, 1816)
Sertularia dohrni Stechow, 1923
Sertularia ephemera Galea, 2010
Sertularia fabricii Levinsen, 1893
Sertularia fissa (Thornely, 1904)
Sertularia flexilis Thompson, 1879
Sertularia flowersi Nutting, 1904
Sertularia gracilis Hassall, 1848
Sertularia gracillima Bale, 1926
Sertularia hattorii Leloup, 1940
Sertularia heteroclada (Jäderholm, 1902)
Sertularia humilis (Armstrong, 1879)
Sertularia intermedia Levinsen, 1913
Sertularia latiuscula Stimpson, 1854
Sertularia linkoi Kudelin, 1914
Sertularia littoralis Thornely, 1900
Sertularia loculosa Busk, 1852
Sertularia maccallumi Bartlett, 1907
Sertularia macrocarpa Bale, 1884
Sertularia malayensis Billard, 1925
Sertularia marginata (Kirchenpauer, 1864)
Sertularia mediterranea (Marktanner-Turneretscher, 1890)
Sertularia mertoni Stechow & Müller, 1923
Sertularia mirabilis (Verrill, 1873)
Sertularia nasonovi Kudelin, 1913
Sertularia notabilis Fraser, 1947
Sertularia nuttingi Levinsen, 1913
Sertularia orthogonalis Gibbons & Ryland, 1989
Sertularia perpusilla Stechow, 1919
Sertularia plumosa (Clark, 1876)
Sertularia robusta (Clark, 1877)
Sertularia rugosissima Thornely, 1904
Sertularia schmidti Kudelin, 1914
Sertularia similis Clark, 1877
Sertularia simplex (Fraser, 1938)
Sertularia snyderi Nutting, 1906
Sertularia stabilis Fraser, 1948
Sertularia staurotheca Naumov, 1960
Sertularia suensoni Levinsen, 1913
Sertularia tatarica Kudelin, 1913
Sertularia tenera G. O. Sars, 1874
Sertularia tenuis Bale, 1884
Sertularia tolli (Jäderholm, 1908)
Sertularia tongensis (Stechow, 1919)
Sertularia trigonostoma Busk, 1852
Sertularia tumida Allman, 1877
Sertularia turbinata (Lamouroux, 1816)
Sertularia unguiculata Busk, 1852
Sertularia vervoorti Migotto & Calder, 1998
Sertularia xuelongi Song, Gravili & Wang, 2016

References

Sertulariidae
Hydrozoan genera